Andrew Desjardins (born July 27, 1986) is a Canadian professional ice hockey centreman who is currently playing with EC VSV in the ICE Hockey League (ICEHL). Earlier in his career, he played for the Chicago Blackhawks and the San Jose Sharks of the National Hockey League (NHL).

Desjardins won the Stanley Cup with the Chicago Blackhawks in 2015. He is also notable for being one of only two players in NHL history to have worn the number 69, with the other being Mel Angelstad.

Playing career

Amateur
Desjardins grew up in the small town of Lively, Ontario, and played his minor hockey for the Onaping Falls Huskies (NOHA) until the bantam level in the 2001–02 season. After that year, he was selected in the 15th round, 295th overall, of the Ontario Hockey League (OHL)'s 2002 Priority Selection by the Sault Ste. Marie Greyhounds. He spent the following 2002–03 season playing for the Rayside-Balfour SabreCats Midgets of the Great North Midget League (NOHA) before making the Greyhounds roster the following year.

Desjardins played four seasons (2003 to 2007) of junior hockey in the OHL with Sault Ste. Marie.

Professional
Desjardins turned professional for the 2007–08 season, suiting up for 64 regular season and 11 playoff games for the Laredo Bucks of the Central Hockey League (CHL). The following season, 2008–09, he played five games in the ECHL with the Phoenix RoadRunners and 74 regular season and 12 playoff games in the American Hockey League (AHL) with the Worcester Sharks. In the 2009–10 season, he played the entire year with Worcester.

On June 26, 2010, the NHL's San Jose Sharks, the parent team of the Worcester Sharks, signed Desjardins as a free agent. He originally wore number 69 with the Sharks, becoming the second player in NHL history behind Mel Angelstad to wear the number in a regular season game, though he later switched to number 10 following the departure of Christian Ehrhoff.

On March 2, 2015, Desjardins was traded to the Chicago Blackhawks in exchange for winger Ben Smith. Desjardins switched his jersey number to 11 upon arrival with Chicago, as 10 was currently in use by Patrick Sharp. He would win the Stanley Cup with the Blackhawks the same season. Desjardins signed a two-year contract worth $1.6 million on July 3 to stay with Chicago. According to his agent, "[Desjardins] loved his time there," and "took less to stay."

At the conclusion of his contract, Desjardins was not re-signed by the Blackhawks and became an unrestricted free agent. On September 13, 2017, it was announced Desjardins would attend the New York Rangers' training camp on a professional tryout agreement (PTO). Desjardins was suspended two preseason games for an illegal check to the head of New Jersey Devils' forward Miles Wood. On October 10, Desjardins was released by the Rangers and signed a deal with German Deutsche Eishockey Liga (DEL) side Adler Mannheim for the 2017–18 season on October 12.

Career statistics

Awards and honours

References

External links

1986 births
Living people
Adler Mannheim players
Canadian expatriate ice hockey players in Germany
Canadian ice hockey centres
Chicago Blackhawks players
Ice hockey people from Ontario
Laredo Bucks players
Phoenix RoadRunners players
San Jose Sharks players
Sault Ste. Marie Greyhounds players
Sportspeople from Greater Sudbury
Stanley Cup champions
Undrafted National Hockey League players
EC VSV players
Worcester Sharks players
Canadian expatriate ice hockey players in the United States
Canadian expatriate ice hockey players in Austria